Miss USA 2012 was the 61st Miss USA pageant, held on June 3, 2012, at The AXIS in Las Vegas, Nevada and it was televised live on NBC. Alyssa Campanella of California crowned her successor Olivia Culpo of Rhode Island at the end of the event. This was Rhode Island's first Miss USA title. Culpo represented the United States at Miss Universe 2012 six months later and went on to win the Miss Universe title, becoming the eighth American to do so.

First runner-up Nana Meriwether of Maryland inherited the Miss USA title replaced Culpo to finish the reign and was officially crowned on January 9, 2013. Meriwether became the second woman from Maryland to hold the Miss USA title; the first, Mary Leona Gage, was dethroned shortly after winning.

For the first time, a question was solicited from Twitter for the final question asked of one of the five finalists. That question picked by the pageant organizers - "Would you feel it would be fair that a transgender woman wins the Miss USA title over a natural-born woman?" - was answered by the winner, Culpo.

Background

Selection of contestants
One delegate from each state and the District of Columbia was chosen in state pageants held which began in July 2011 and ended in January 2012. The first state pageant was Florida, held on July 16, 2011 as scheduled. The final pageant was Nevada, held on January 29, 2012.

Eight delegates are former Miss Teen USA state winners, while one is a former Miss America state winner and the other one competed in Miss Earth United States.

Preliminary round
Prior to the final telecast, the delegates competed in the preliminary competition, which involves private interviews with the judges and a presentation show where they compete in swimsuit and evening gown. The preliminary competition took place on May 30, 2012, at 10 pm (ET) hosted by Chet Buchanan and Alyssa Campanella, and was broadcast online over Xbox Live via their YouTube and MSN applications.

Finals
During the final competition, the top sixteen competed in swimsuit, while the top ten competed evening gown, and the top five competed in the final question signed up by a panel of judges. The sixteenth semifinalist was determined by voting online.

Results

‡ Voted into Top 16 as America's Choice via Internet 
∞ Culpo won Miss Universe 2012. Due to protocol, Culpo resigns her title as Miss USA 2012. 1st runner-up, Nana Meriwether, replaces her as Miss USA.

Special awards

Order of announcements

Top 16

Top 10

Top 5

Delegates

Judges
Preliminary Judges
 Michael Agbabian
 Cindy Barshop
 Stefan C. Campbell
 Renee Simon
 Alison Taub
 Kim Wagner
 Randall Winston

Final Judges
 Sol Vargas
 Ali Fedotowsky
 Arsenio Hall
 Marilu Henner
 Joe Jonas
 Rob Kardashian
 George Kotsiopoulos
 Dayana Mendoza, Miss Universe 2008 from Venezuela

Background music
 Opening Fashion Show – "Turn Up the Radio" (Remix) by Madonna, and "LaserLight" by Jessie J featuring David Guetta (background music)
 Swimsuit Competition – "#1Nite (One Night)" and "You Make Me Feel..." by Cobra Starship (live performance)
 Evening Gown Competition – "Lights" (Original and instrumental versions) by Ellie Goulding (background music)
 Top 5 Final Look – "America's Most Wanted" by Akon (live performance)

Historical significance
 Rhode Island wins the competition for the first time, surpasses its previous highest placement in 2007 and becoming the 31st state who does it for the first time. Would go on to win Miss Universe 2012 in December of that year as USA.
 Maryland earns the 1st runner-up position for the second time. The last time it placed this was in 1968. Also became the second woman from Maryland to win the Miss USA title. Prior to this Mary Leona Gage, outright winner of Miss USA 1957, was disqualified after discovered she had been married and had two children. She finished as 1st runner-up, but succeeded as Miss USA 2012 after Olivia Culpo won Miss Universe.
 Ohio earns the 2nd runner-up position for the first time and reaches its highest placement since Halle Berry in 1986.
 Nevada earns the 3rd runner-up position for the first time and reaches its highest placement since 2007.
 Georgia earns the 4th runner-up position for the sixth time. The last time it placed this was in 1989.
 States that placed in the top 16 the previous year were Alabama, Georgia, Maine, Maryland, South Carolina, Tennessee, and Texas.
 Tennessee made its seventh straight placement.
 Alabama and Maine placed for the third consecutive year.
 Georgia, Maryland, South Carolina and Texas made their second consecutive placement.
 Ohio last placed in 2006.
 Louisiana and Nevada last placed in 2007.
 New Jersey and Rhode Island last placed in 2008.
 Arkansas, Colorado, Michigan and Oklahoma last placed in 2010. Arkansas Kelsey Dow made it past the first elimination due to new media technology (Internet/SMS vote).
 California breaks an ongoing streak of placements since 2005 after Natalie Pack failed to place in the semifinals.
 Missouri breaks an ongoing streak of placements since 2010.

Notes

References

External links
 Miss USA official website 

2012
June 2012 events in the United States
2012 beauty pageants
2012 in Nevada
Zappos Theater